Ovidio Montalbani (18 November 1601 – 20 September 1671), also known by his pseudonym Giovanni Antonio Bumaldi, was an Italian polymath. He was a professor of logic, mathematics, astronomy, and medicine at the University of Bologna.

Life 
Ovidio Montalbani studied philosophy with Vincenzo Montecalvi and medicine with the famous physician Bartolomeo Ambrosini. In 1625 at a very young age he became a lector at the University of Bologna, teaching first logic, then the theoretic medicine, mathematics and astronomy and later moral philosophy. In 1657, he became custodian of the Aldrovandi Museum - succeeding Bartolomeo Ambrosini, who had been custodian since 1642. He was the doyen of the Collegio Medico of Bologna ﻿and its prior from 1664 onwards.

Montalbani was a member of several academies, including the Accademia dei Gelati (with the alias "l'Innestato"), the Accademia degli Indomiti (as "lo Stellato"), and the Accademia della Notte (as "il Rugiadoso"). He was also a member of the free-thinking Venetian Accademia degli Incogniti, as well as one of the founders of the Accademia dei Vespertini, which held its first Assemblies in his house.

A politically involved citizen of the city of Bologna, he held several magistrates, such as those of the court of the merchant forum and Tribune of the Plebs. As a censor﻿ for the Bolognese Inquisition he was charged of reviewing the first edition of﻿ Galileo’s Complete Works, published in Bologna by Carlo Manolessi, in 1655–1656.

He died in Bologna on 20 September 1671.

Works 
Ovidio Montalbani was one of the most prolific polymaths of his day. Among his many publications can be found works on archaeology, linguistics, medicine and botany. In 1629 he was given the task of writing the Tacuino, a sort of annually produced astrological calendar for doctors indicating the best and worst days for blood-letting, purges and surgery. Montalbani often enriched this medical «almanac» with essays on subjects as diverse as the grafting of plants and the Bolognese and Lombard dialects. Montalbani's tacuinum of 1661, entitled, Antineotiologia, an attack on innovations in the practice of medicine, was harshly criticized by Marcello Malpighi and Giovanni Alfonso Borelli.

In his “De Illuminabili Lapide Bononiensi Epistola” (1634), Montalbani discussed the properties of the “Bologna stone” a piece of barium sulfate (baryte) found on Mount Paderno. Montalbani's treatise was one of the first studies on the subject of inorganic phosphorescence. In 1668 Montalbani edited the previously unprinted Dendrologia by Ulisse Aldrovandi.

Montalbani published a number of scientific works under the pseudonym of Giovanni Antonio Bumaldi. Carl Peter Thunberg gave the name of Bumalda to a genus of Japanese plants.

A close friend of Thomas Dempster, he pronounced his funeral oration, which was published in Bologna in 1626, a year after Dempster's death.

Montalbani is an ambivalent figure in the early seventeenth-century Scientific Revolution.﻿ While he was a proponent of empirical observation in natural philosophy, he was also a staunch opponent of Marcello Malpighi’s medical ideas and a proponent of the Ptolemaic system.

Main works

Aldrovandine
 (Editing), Dendrologiae naturalis scilicet arborum historiae libri duo, Bologna 1668 (online).

Miscellaneous
 
 
 
 
 
 
 
 
 
  The French botanist Jean-François Séguier highly praised this book and included a reprint of it as an appendix to his own Bibliotheca botanica of 1740.

Notes

Bibliography 

 
 
 
 
 
 Antonio Neviani, Le Curae analyticae di Ovidio Montalbani Spigolatura aldrovandiana, in Atti della Pontificia Accademia delle scienze nuovi Lincei, LXXXVII, sess. IV, Civitate Vaticana [1934], pp. 267–272;

External links 

 
 

1671 deaths
1601 births
17th-century Italian mathematicians
University of Bologna alumni
17th-century Italian physicians
Academic staff of the University of Bologna
Physicians from Bologna
Pre-Linnaean botanists
Scientists from Bologna
17th-century Italian botanists
Italian naturalists